RING finger protein 11 is a protein that in humans is encoded by the RNF11 gene.

Function 

The protein encoded by this gene contains a RING-H2 finger motif, which is known to be important for protein-protein interactions. The expression of this gene has been shown to be induced by mutant RET proteins (MEN2A/MEN2B). The germline mutations in RET gene are known to be responsible for the development of multiple endocrine neoplasia (MEN).

See also 
 RING finger domain

Interactions 

RNF11 has been shown to interact with RIPK1 and STAMBP.

References

Further reading

External links 
 

RING finger proteins